DENIS J081730.0−615520 (also known as 2MASS 08173001−6155158) is a T brown dwarf approximately  away in the constellation Carina. It was discovered by Etienne Artigau and his colleagues in April 2010. The star belongs to the T6 spectral class implying a photosphere temperature of about 950 K. It has a mass of about 15 MJ (Jupiter masses) or about 1.5% the mass of the Sun.

DENIS J081730.0-615520 is the second-nearest isolated T dwarf to the Sun (after UGPS J0722−0540) and the fifth-nearest (also after ε Indi Bab and SCR 1845-6357B) if one takes into account T dwarfs in multiple star systems. It is also the brightest T dwarf in the sky (in the J-band); it had been missed before due to its proximity to the galactic plane.

References

External links 
Astronomers Announce First Clear Evidence of a Brown Dwarf – STScI news release STScI-1995-48 (November 29, 1995)

Brown dwarfs
Local Bubble
T-type stars
Carina (constellation)
DENIS objects
J08173001-6155158
WISE objects